All-Ukrainian Union "Cherkashchany" is a regional political party in Cherkasy Oblast, Ukraine. It was registered on November 23, 1992.

Until 2006, the party was known as Christian-Democratic Party of Ukraine and had links with the Christian Liberal Party of Ukraine of Leonid Chernovetskyi (Leonid Chernovetskyi Bloc). 

In the 2020 Ukrainian local elections, it won a plurality of 18 out of 64 seats in the Cherkasy Oblast Council.

Election results

Cherkasy Oblast Council

References

External links
History of the party
Profile
Profile at RBC of Ukraine
Profile at the Center of political information DATA
Profile at Korrespondent magazine
Zhuravsky party at the NDP bloc

1992 establishments in Ukraine
Agrarian parties in Ukraine
Political parties established in 1992
Political parties in Ukraine
Social democratic parties in Ukraine